A Q-star, also known as a grey hole, is a hypothetical type of a compact, heavy neutron star with an exotic state of matter. Such a star can be smaller than the progenitor star's Schwarzschild radius and have a gravitational pull so strong that some light, but not all light, cannot escape. The Q stands for a conserved particle number. A Q-Star may be mistaken for a stellar black hole.

Types of Q-stars
SUSY Q-ball
B-ball, stable Q-balls with a large baryon number B. They may exist in neutron stars that have absorbed Q-ball(s).

See also
Black hole
Stellar black hole
Compact star
Exotic star
Boson star
Electroweak star
Preon star
Strange star
Quark star

References

Further reading

Degenerate stars
Compact stars
Hypothetical stars